Jayson Papeau (born 30 June 1996) is a French professional footballer who plays as a midfielder for Liga I club Rapid București.

Career
On 2 January 2020, Papeau signed on loan with FC Chambly from Amiens. On 10 January 2020, he made his professional debut with Chambly in a 1–0 Ligue 2 win over Orléans. On 31 August 2021, Papeau switched to the Polish Ekstraklasa club Warta Poznań on a permanent transfer.

On 22 July 2022, Rapid București announced Papeau would join the Romanian club on a two-year contract, with a one-year extension option.

Personal life
Papeau is of Guadeloupean descent.

References

External links
 

1996 births
Living people
Footballers from Seine-et-Marne
Sportspeople from Melun
French footballers
French people of Guadeloupean descent
Association football midfielders
Sainte-Geneviève Sports players
Amiens SC players
FC Chambly Oise players
Warta Poznań players
FC Rapid București players
Championnat National 2 players
Championnat National 3 players
Liga I players
Ligue 2 players
Ekstraklasa players
French expatriate footballers
French expatriate sportspeople in Poland
French expatriate sportspeople in Romania
Expatriate footballers in Poland
Expatriate footballers in Romania